Cranwell Leslie Bull  (born 19 August 1946), commonly known as Cran Bull, is a New Zealand cricket administrator and former player, who played first-class cricket for Canterbury for 19 seasons.

Early life
Born in Auckland on 19 August 1946, Bull was educated at Christchurch Boys' High School from 1960 to 1964. He went on to study law at the University of Canterbury, graduating LLB.

Cricket

Playing career
Bull represented Canterbury at first-class level from 1965/66 until 1983/84, playing 60 matches in all. A right-handed batsman, he scored 1841 runs at an average of 19.58, with a high score of 115 not out. He captained Canterbury for four years.

Administration
For over 30 years, Bull was a committee member at the Christchurch High School Old Boys' Cricket Club, and served terms as both secretary and president. He was a member of the Canterbury Cricket Association (CCA) management committee, and was also a director and chair of the board of CCA. He was an elected executive member of the New Zealand Cricket Board of Control, including a period as deputy chair.

Legal career
Bull became a partner at the Christchurch legal firm of Saunders & Co in 1972, having joined as a law clerk two years earlier. He specialised in commercial law, and retired in December 2016. He has provided legal advice to New Zealand Cricket, and was involved in reforming that body's constitution.

Honours
Bull was the recipient of the Bert Sutcliffe Medal in 2012, awarded by New Zealand Cricket for outstanding services to cricket.

In the 2017 Queen's Birthday Honours, Bull was appointed a Member of the New Zealand Order of Merit for services to cricket.

References

1946 births
Living people
Cricketers from Auckland
People educated at Christchurch Boys' High School
New Zealand cricketers
Canterbury cricketers
New Zealand cricket administrators
20th-century New Zealand lawyers
Members of the New Zealand Order of Merit
21st-century New Zealand lawyers